Sir John Austen, 2nd Baronet (c. 16401699) was an English landowner and politician who sat in the House of Commons at various times between 1667 and 1699.

Austen was the son of Sir Robert Austen, 1st Baronet of Hall Place, Bexley and his wife Anne Muns, daughter of Thomas Muns, of Otteridge in Bersted, Kent, and of London. He was admitted to Gray's Inn on 23 Oct. 1657. He succeeded to the baronetcy on the death of his father on 30 October 1666. He had acquired the estate of Stagenhoe, Hertfordshire though his marriage as well as inheriting Hall Place, Bexley. In 1667, he was elected Member of Parliament for Rye in a by-election to the Cavalier Parliament. He was elected MP for Rye again in 1689, 1690, 1695 and 1698. He was one of the Commissioners of the Customs from 1697 to 1698.

He had two brothers, Robert Austen of Tenterden, Kent and Edward Austen of Middle Temple, London.
 
Austen died in Red Lion Square, London at the age of about 58.

Austen married by licence dated 6 December 1661,  Rose Hale, daughter of Sir John Hale, of Stagenhoe and his wife Elizabeth Bale, daughter of Edmond Bale, of Saddington, Leicestershire. She died in May or November 1695, and was buried at Stagenhoe.

References

1640 births
1699 deaths
Baronets in the Baronetage of England
Members of Gray's Inn
17th-century English landowners
English MPs 1661–1679
English MPs 1689–1690
English MPs 1690–1695
English MPs 1695–1698
English MPs 1698–1700